The canton of Malaucène is a French former administrative division in the department of Vaucluse and region Provence-Alpes-Côte d'Azur. It had 4,980 inhabitants (2012). It was disbanded following the French canton reorganisation which came into effect in March 2015. It consisted of 7 communes, which joined the canton of Vaison-la-Romaine in 2015.

Composition
The communes in the canton of Malaucène:
Le Barroux
Beaumont-du-Ventoux
Brantes
Entrechaux
Malaucène
Saint-Léger-du-Ventoux
Savoillan

References

Malaucene
2015 disestablishments in France
States and territories disestablished in 2015